Fairforest Creek is a stream in Union and Spartanburg counties, in the U.S. state of South Carolina.

According to tradition, a pioneer named the region when, noting the scenery, he said "What a fair forest!"

See also
List of rivers of South Carolina

References

Rivers of Spartanburg County, South Carolina
Rivers of Union County, South Carolina
Rivers of South Carolina